Fatisha Anita Imo (born c. 1988) was crowned Miss World Saint Kitts and Nevis 2010. She represented the country at Miss World 2010.

Early life
She is a student of accounting and Spanish at Midwestern State University.

The last representative from St. Kitts and Nevis in Miss World before Imo was Haley Cassius in 1988. Cassius is Imo's Godmother.

References

Miss World 2010 delegates
1980s births
Living people
Saint Kitts and Nevis beauty pageant winners
People from Basseterre
Midwestern State University alumni